Uluberia is a city and a municipality of Howrah district in the Indian state of West Bengal. It is the headquarters of the Uluberia subdivision. It is a part of the area covered by Kolkata Metropolitan Development Authority (KMDA). This city is famous for its industrial belts.

History
In 1873 the present Uluberia subdivision was constituted in the name of “Mahishrekha” which was subsequently renamed as Uluberia in 1882. William Carry, the famous Baptist visited Uluberia several times during late 19th century. During 1930's civil disobedience movement, there was huge uprising in shyampur police station. After becoming congress president Netaji subhas chandra bose gave speech in Gorur Hat of uluberia in 1938 .

Geography

It is situated on the banks of the  river Hooghly. The main road passing through the heart of the city is Orissa trunk road and is also well connected by National Highway No-6; Bombay Road. This is an unplanned city So there use to be huge waterlogging during heavy rain but now with the improvement of drainage system it has been solved. One of the other problems is erosion of the Hooghly River and encroachment of land.

Climate

Civic Administration
The Uluberia Municipality was Formed in 22nd September 1982 with a area of 33.72sq.km and 28 wards, now it has expanded to 34.10sq.km and 32 wards.

Demographics
As of 2011 India census,  As per provisional reports of Census India, population of Uluberia in 2011 is 222,240; of which male and female are 113,923 and 108,317 respectively. Although Uluberia city has population of 222,240; its urban / metropolitan population is 14,035,959 of which 7,251,908 are males and 6,784,051 are females, with a sex Ratio of 951 and average literacy of 80.54%. The Percentage of population of children have increased from 6% in 2001 to 11.8% in 2011 and child sex ratio is 956.

With the partition of India in 1947 came a significant number of refugees from East Pakistan, who mainly settled in Kolkata and its outlying areas, forming colonies on the banks of the Hooghly River, including near Uluberia on the west bank.

Religion in Uluberia
The majority religion in Uluberia is Hinduism with about 54.87%, with a sizeable minority of Muslim at 44.79% and other religion like Christianity with 0.11%, Buddhism and Shikism at 0.03% and others at 0.3% .

Economy
Uluberia is an industrial town.It was a major jute processing town during the colonial and post Independence era but slowly the jute industry declined and now there is no big jute mill in Uluberia. In 2006 the Salim Group of Indonesia planned to invest $250 million in a motorcycle factory.

Industrial Park 
There exist about 70 industrial units in Uluberia Industrial Park.The Industrial Park is providing lease holding to various industrial units and institutions for setting up their plants with Building Plan approved by the WBIIDC itself. There exist two large water bodies inside the campus are breathing spaces for the zone. Some of the prominent industrial units are:
1) Ceratizit India Private Limited. 
2) Saj Industries Pvt (Biskfarm). 
3) Sintex Industries Ltd.
4) Goel Alloy & Steel Pvt. Ltd.

Healthcare 
The healthcare of Uluberia is mainly dominated by the small private hospitals other than that, there are a number of Good government hospitals in the city like the Uluberia hospital, E.S.I Hospital , Uluberia Sub-divisional hospital . Few popular private hospitals are Sebarata Hospital and Sanjiban Hospital.

Education 

Before LPG reforms the education sector was mainly dominated by the public institutions but now most of the people prefers the private schools. The oldest college in Uluberia is the Uluberia College (founded in 1948) and other colleges are Om Dayal Group of Institutions, Bharat technology, Calcutta institute of technology, Calcutta institute of pharmaceutical technology and allied health sciences and Panchla mahavidyalaya. other than that one Medical college is also being constructed at the ESI Hospital Uluberia.

Transport

This city has National Highway 6, South Eastern Railway zone and Cuttack Road pass through it. The Hooghly River surrounds the south part of this town. There is also ferry service from Uluberia to Budge budge and other towns of Howrah and South 24 parganas. The town is served by Uluberia railway station. The rapid growth of this city in past few decades have caused bottlenecks in the traffic flow of the city, the station Road, the Odisha trunk and the road connecting Uluberia court and Uluberia Kalibari is Highly congested in the peak hours.

External links
 Map of Howrah district

References

Cities and towns in Howrah district
Neighbourhoods in Kolkata
Kolkata Metropolitan Area
Neighbourhoods in Howrah
Cities in West Bengal